Clason may refer to:

In people:
 Charles R. Clason, a Republican member of the United States House of Representatives 
 George Samuel Clason, an American finance and investment writer
 Hugo Clason, a Swedish sailor
 Isak Gustaf Clason, a Swedish architect
 Jesse Clason (1860-1918), an American physician and politician

In other uses:
 Clason Map Company, a US company
 Clason Prairie, Wisconsin, a ghost town, USA
 Clason Point, Bronx, New York, USA